Tissue inhibitor of metalloproteinases 2 (TIMP2) is a gene and a corresponding protein. The gene is a member of the TIMP gene family. The protein is thought to be a metastasis suppressor.

Function 

The proteins encoded by this gene family are natural inhibitors of the matrix metalloproteinases (MMP), a group of peptidases involved in degradation of the extracellular matrix. In addition to an inhibitory role against metalloproteinases, the encoded protein has a unique role among TIMP family members in its ability to directly suppress the proliferation of endothelial cells. As a result, the encoded protein may be critical to the maintenance of tissue homeostasis by suppressing the proliferation of quiescent tissues in response to angiogenic factors, and by inhibiting protease activity in tissues undergoing remodelling of the extracellular matrix. TIMP2 functions as both an MMP inhibitor and an activator. TIMPs inhibit active MMPs, but different TIMPs inhibit different MMPs better than others. For example, TIMP-1 inhibits MMP-7, MMP-9, MMP-1 and MMP-3 better than TIMP-2, and TIMP-2 inhibits MMP-2 more effectively than other TIMPs.

In melanocytic cells TIMP2 gene expression may be regulated by MITF.

A more recent discovery is that TIMP2 plays an important role in hippocampal function and cognitive function. It plays a critical role in the benefit conferred to old mice when given human umbilical cord blood.

Interactions 

TIMP2 has been shown to interact with:
 MMP14  and
 MMP2.

See also 
 TIMP1, TIMP3, TIMP4

References

Further reading

External links 
 The MEROPS online database for peptidases and their inhibitors: I35.002